Wright Island is an ice-covered island  long, lying at the north edge of Getz Ice Shelf about midway between Carney Island and Martin Peninsula, on the Bakutis Coast, Marie Byrd Land. Delineated from air photos taken by U.S. Navy Operation Highjump in January 1947. Named by Advisory Committee on Antarctic Names (US-ACAN) after Admiral Jerauld Wright, U.S. Navy, Commander in Chief, Atlantic Fleet, in over-all command of the U.S. Navy's Deep Freeze operations during the IGY, 1957–58.

See also 
 Composite Antarctic Gazetteer
 List of Antarctic and sub-Antarctic islands
 List of Antarctic islands south of 60° S
 SCAR
 Territorial claims in Antarctica

External links
Wright Island - SCAR Gazetteer Ref. No 16234 - Australian Antarctic Data Centre

Islands of Marie Byrd Land